Selemdzhinsky District  is an administrative and municipal district (raion), one of the twenty in Amur Oblast, Russia. Its administrative center is the urban locality (a work settlement) of Ekimchan. Population:  11,808 (2002 Census);  The population of Ekimchan accounts for 10.4% of the district's total population.

Geography
The Selemdzha Range, Ezop Range, Yam-Alin Range and the northern part of the Turan Range, are located in the district. River Selemdzha and its tributaries Ulma, Byssa and Nora flow across the district.

References

Sources

Districts of Amur Oblast